A Voice in the Dark is a 1921 American black-and-white silent mystery film directed by Frank Lloyd and starring Ramsey Wallace, Irene Rich, and Alec B. Francis. The film is based on the play A Voice in the Dark by Ralph E. Dyar (New York, July 28, 1919).

Plot
Two sisters engaged on the same day: Adele, the younger, to Dr. Hugh Sainsbury, and Blanche, the eldest, to Harlan Day, an assistant district attorney. They are both suspected of committing a murder when Sainsbury is found dead. Blanche has a motive as Sainsbury almost dishonored her so that she wanted to prevent her sister from marrying him. Thanks to the testimony of two witnesses, a deaf woman and a blind man residing in the sanatorium where Sainsbury was working, the murder is resolved: the culprit is Amelia Ellingham, a nurse whom Sainsbury had seduced and to whom he had proposed to marry.

Cast
Ramsey Wallace as Harlan Day
Irene Rich as  Blanche Walton
Alec B. Francis as  Joseph Crampton (as Alec Francis)
Alan Hale as  Dr. Hugh Sainsbury
Ora Carew as  Adele Walton
William Scott as  Chester Thomas
Richard Tucker as  Lieutenant Patrick Cloyd
Alice Hollister as  Amelia Ellingham
Gertrude Norman as  Mrs. Lydiard
James Neill as  Edward Small

Preservation status
A print is preserved in the Library of Congress.

References

External links

1921 films
American silent feature films
Films directed by Frank Lloyd
1921 drama films
Silent American drama films
American black-and-white films
1920s English-language films
1920s American films
1921 mystery films
American mystery films
Goldwyn Pictures films